The 1956–57 season was the 77th season of competitive football in England.

Manchester United won the First Division to become English football champions for the fifth time. Tottenham Hotspur were runners-up. In the Second Division it was Leicester City who finished in top spot, ahead of East Midlands rivals, Nottingham Forest. Hartlepools United finished as runners-up to Derby County in Third Division North, while in the Third Division South, Ipswich Town won the title ahead of Torquay United.

Aston Villa won a record seventh FA Cup,  beating Manchester United in the final and denying their opponents the chance of being the first double winners of the 20th century. The Charity Shield featured a Manchester derby, with United defeating City in the match.

The England national team won the British Home Championship, with Scotland the runners-up.

Honours

Notes = Number in parentheses is the times that club has won that honour. * indicates new record for competition

Awards
Football Writers' Association
 Footballer of the Year – Tom Finney (Preston North End)
Top goalscorer
 John Charles (Leeds United), 38

FA Cup

Aston Villa won the FA Cup for a then record seventh time.

Football League

First Division
Manchester United's young team dominated the English game once again, retaining the First Division title and also becoming England's first representatives in the European Cup, reaching the semi-finals, and also finishing runners-up in the FA Cup to an Aston Villa side who won the trophy for a record seventh time. Tottenham Hotspur finished runners-up, while Tom Finney's influence at Preston helped the Deepdale side finish third, while another veteran winger, Stanley Matthews, helped his own side finish fourth. Leeds United enjoyed possibly their best season to date by finishing eighth, but their hopes of further achievements in the immediate future were then hit by the news that star striker John Charles would be on his way to Juventus of Italy in a transfer worth £65,000.

Charlton Athletic and Cardiff City went down to the Second Division.

Second Division
It was an East Midlands promotion double in the Second Division as Leicester City won the title by a comfortable margin, and were joined on the way upwards by runners-up and local rivals Nottingham Forest. Liverpool missed out on promotion by a single point under the management of their former player Phil Taylor, while Blackburn Rovers fell two points short of promotion.

Bury and Port Vale went down from the Second Division.

Third Division North
Derby County, who had declined sharply since their 1946 FA Cup triumph, finally enjoyed some long-awaited success by winning the Third Division North title and promotion to the Second Division.

Third Division South
Alf Ramsey, the former Tottenham and England player, guided Ipswich Town to title glory in the Third Division South, securing their promotion to the Second Division ahead of a Torquay side who had yet to play Second Division football. The leading pair finished a single point ahead of Colchester United, one of the Football League's newest members.

Top goalscorers

First Division
John Charles (Leeds United) – 38 goals

Second Division
Arthur Rowley (Leicester City) – 44 goals

Third Division North
Ray Straw (Derby County) – 37 goals

Third Division South
Ted Phillips (Ipswich Town) – 42 goals

Notable debutants

6 October 1956: Bobby Charlton, five days short of his 19th birthday, scores twice on his debut for Manchester United in a 4-2 home win over Charlton Athletic in the First Division.

24 October 1956: David Gaskell, 16-year-old goalkeeper, keeps goal for Manchester United in their Charity Shield match against Manchester City due to an injury to regular goalkeeper Ray Wood.

24 December 1956: Denis Law, 16-year-old Scottish forward, makes his debut for Huddersfield Town against Notts County in the Second Division.

Europe
League champions Manchester United became the first English side to enter the European Cup, now in its second season. They began on a high note by eliminating Belgian champions Anderlecht, confirming qualification for the first knockout round by beating the Belgian side 10-0 in the preliminary round second leg at Maine Road. They reached the semi-finals, narrowly being beaten by defending European champions Real Madrid of Spain, who went on to retain the trophy.

References